Sebastián Pérez Bouquet Pérez (born 22 June 2003) is a Mexican professional footballer who plays as a midfielder for Liga MX club Guadalajara.

Club career
Pérez Bouquet is a youth product of Guadalajara having joined their academy at the age of 4, and worked their way up all their youth categories. He made his professional debut with Guadalajara in a 3–1 Liga MX loss to Tigres UANL on 22 February 2022, coming on as a substitute in the 76th minute. He began his career registered with Guadalajara's reserves Tapatío, and scored 4 goals in his first 2 games with them, earning appearances with their senior team.

International career
Pérez Bouquet was called up to the Mexico U16s in September 2019. He was called up to a training camp for the Mexico U20s in May 2022.

Playing style
Pérez Bouquet is a versatile player who played as a winger and second striker in his youth, but stands out most as a central midfielder. Despite his slight build, he is strong and agile. He has great movement between the lines to find space and is always available as a second option, helped by his great dribbling.

Career statistics

Club

References

External links

2003 births
Living people
Footballers from Guadalajara, Jalisco
Mexican footballers
Association football midfielders
C.D. Guadalajara footballers
Liga MX players
Liga de Expansión MX players
Mexican people of French descent